Joel Pelletier (born 1961) is an American contemporary musician, painter, actor and political commentator. He is known for his version of Ensor's Christ's Entry Into Brussels in 1889.

Life
Born in Massachusetts, Pelletier received a degree in Music Composition from the Hartt School of Music, University of Hartford.

Music
Residing in Los Angeles since 1988, he has been active as a musician and songwriter, performing his original chamber pop music, and playing mostly electric bass guitar. Since 2006 he has specialized in live classic rock performing, including tribute bands recreating The Who as bassist John Entwistle, San Jose, CA's Zeppelin Live and Jimmy Sakurai’s Mr. Jimmy Led Zeppelin Revival as Led Zeppelin bassist/keyboardist/mandolin player John Paul Jones (musician), and San Jose's Journey Unauthorized performing Journey (band) music on keyboards. He also records and performs as pianist with The Lush Pop Trio.

Works

In 2004, Pelletier created a modern-day version of James Ensor's Christ's Entry Into Brussels in 1889  called American Fundamentalists: Christ’s Entry into Washington in 2008. Pelletier’s work adapts and expands Ensor's mockery of government, religious and business leaders, recasting the return of Jesus based on modern biblical interpretations of the late 20th century American Christian Fundamentalist and Christian Dominionist movements, especially of Left Behind author and activist Tim LaHaye. The work has been displayed throughout the United States and Europe, usually accompanied by presentations by and discussion with the artist.

American Fundamentalist Movement
Pelletier has written a manifesto that comments on American Fundamentalism. Religion, politics, economy, and corporations are discussed.

References

External links
 
 Joel Pelletier's JOHN PAUL JOEL Tribute project site
 ZEPPELIN LIVE band site
 Mr. Jimmy Led Zeppelin Revival band site
 THE LUSH POP TRIO site
 Joel Pelletier AMERICAN FUNDAMENTALISTS site
 Review of Pelletier's CD CHAMBER POP
 CHAMBER POP review at Home Theater and High Fidelity
 Review of CHAMBER POP at The Muse's Muse
 Listen to artist talk by Joel Pelletier on "American Fundamentalists at Institute for Humanist Studies in Albany, NY
 Louis Vandenberg presents American Fundamentalists (from The Daily Kos)
 Artist to lead panel on controversial artwork "Fundamentalists" at University of Wisconsin Eau Claire
 Painting and artist appearing in Madison, WI
 Official Fundamental Website

Living people
20th-century American painters
American male painters
21st-century American painters
21st-century American male artists
Chamber pop musicians
American rock bass guitarists
American actors
1961 births
University of Hartford Hartt School alumni
20th-century American male artists